Abdollah Khan, also known by his honorific Amin ol-Dowleh ("trustee of the realm"; 1779–1847), was the chief revenue accountant or minister of finance (mostowfi ol-mamalek) and later prime minister under the Qajar shah Fath-Ali Shah (1797–1834). He was born as the oldest son of the former prime minister Hajji Mohammad Hossein Isfahani (died 1823). It appears his mother was a daughter of a petty chief from the Bakhtiari clan. He was born in Isfahan, of which he also served as governor during his career.

References

1779 births
1847 deaths
People from Isfahan
Qajar governors of Isfahan
Mostowfi ol-Mamaleks (title)
Prime Ministers of Iran
18th-century Iranian people
19th-century Iranian people